Petar Cvirn (born 1 September 1986 in Zagreb) is a Croatian actor.

History 
Cvirn first started acting at the age of 10 in a partner theatre of the Croatian National Theatre. Cvirn has been chosen since elementary school to play lead roles 14 different plays and works such as Cinderella, and as the Greek God Apolo in The Fury of the Gods. He debuted on the big screen as a 13-year-old in the movie God Forbid a Worse Thing Should Happen by Snježana Tribuson. Freedom from Despair was his next film.

Filmography

Television roles 
 Ruza vjetrova as Filip (2011)
 Dolina sunca as Lovro Bukovac (2009–2010)
 Balkan Inc. as Kreso Lisjak (2006)

Film roles 
 Half an Hour for Granny (2010)
 Sleep Sweet, My Darling (2005)
 Freedom from Despair (2004)
 God Forbid a Worse Thing Should Happen (2002)

References 

20th-century Croatian male actors
Croatian male film actors
Croatian male television actors
Living people
1986 births
21st-century Croatian male actors
Male actors from Zagreb